Cycnia niveola is a moth of the family Erebidae. It was described by Embrik Strand in 1919. It is found in Ecuador.

References

Phaegopterina
Moths described in 1919